Minor League Cricket (branded as the Toyota Minor League Cricket Championship presented by Sling TV for sponsorship reasons, and sometimes shortened to MiLC) is an American Twenty20 cricket developmental league for Major League Cricket which completed its first season in 2021, after it was delayed from a mid-to-late 2020 start due to the COVID-19 pandemic. It consists of 26 teams from four regions. The league began its regional draft process in late-August 2020, and a series of exhibition games in September 2020. The draft for the league began on June 4, 2021. The Strikers won the inaugural finals against the New Jersey Stallions by 6 wickets, with the Thunderbolts winning the 2022 finals against the Atlanta Fire by 10 runs.

History 
Talks of an American Twenty20 league started in November 2018 just before USA Cricket became the new governing body of cricket in the United States. In May 2021, USA Cricket announced they had accepted a bid by American Cricket Enterprises (ACE) for a $1 billion investment covering the league and other investments benefitting the U.S. national teams.

In an Annual General Meeting on February 21, 2020, it was announced that ACE was planning to launch its professional T20 league Major League Cricket in 2021, and a developmental league, Minor League Cricket that summer. USA Cricket CEO Iain Higgins stated that ACE had "demonstrated an understanding of the importance of addressing various fundamental issues within the domestic game in the United States", and listed a number of metropolitan areas that the developmental league planned to target for franchises.

Both leagues would be delayed due to the COVID-19 pandemic in the United States, with Minor League Cricket being delayed to 2021, and Major League Cricket provisionally postponed to 2022 (in May 2021, Major League Cricket would be further-delayed to 2023 due to both the pandemic, and the need to develop more facilities). Minor League Cricket would still soft launch in 2020 with an exhibition league;  the draft for the exhibition league began on August 22, 2020, with the teams releasing their squads on August 24.

After the conclusion of the exhibition league, USA Cricket announced that they were planning to launch the inaugural season of Minor League Cricket in the spring of 2021. The season launched on July 31, 2021, and ran until October 3, 2021, where the Silicon Valley Strikers won the finals against the New Jersey Stallions by 6 wickets to win the inaugural season title. The sanctioning body announced plans to establish women's leagues in the future.

In February 2021, MLC announced plans for a youth version of Minor and Major League Cricket, as part of a pathway to give young cricketers the opportunity to play for official domestic teams and the national team. In June 2022, MLC announced the inaugural season of the Minor League Cricket Youth Tournament (shortened to MiLC Youth), with UST tapped as title sponsor for the tournament. The inaugural season of MiLC Youth was announced to be contested between 11 teams at the Prairie View Cricket Complex in Houston starting July 25, 2022. The finals for the inaugural season took place on July 29 at between the Dallas Mustangs and the New Jersey Stallions,. in which the Stallions beat the Mustangs by 2 wickets.

In January 2022, USA Cricket announced that the 2022 Minor League Cricket season would start on June 25, and conclude with the final on August 28. The 2022 finals were won by the Seattle Thunderbolts, who beat the Atlanta Fire by 10 runs to win their maiden MiLC title. It was also announced in June 2022 that the budget for the 2022 season was more than $5 million.

Current teams 
Unlike Major League Cricket, Minor League Cricket uses privately owned franchises. American Cricket Enterprises (ACE) announced 24 teams and their owners on August 15, 2020. On June 3, 2021, ACE added 3 more teams. Additionally, the teams are part of 2 "conferences", which are each split into 2 "divisions". This consists of the Pacific Conference, split into the Western and Central divisions, and the Atlantic Conference, which is split into the Eastern and Southern divisions.

For the 2022 season, the Chicago Catchers and the Atlanta Param Veers franchises were replaced by the Chicago Tigers and the Atlanta Lightning for the 2022 season, while the  Austin Athletics and the Irving Mustangs were renamed the Lone Star Athletics and the Dallas Mustangs respectively. It was also announced that the Florida Beamers were on hiatus for the 2022 season, and as such, would not return for the 2022 season.

Venues 

  - Western Division (Pacific Conference)
  - Central Division (Pacific Conference)
  - Eastern Division (Atlantic Conference)
  - Southern Division (Atlantic Conference)

League structure 
Teams in each division will play anywhere from 14 to 16 games in the league stage. Once the league stage is completed, the top two teams in each division will advance to the quarterfinals, wherein the top team in each division will face the 2nd-placed team in the other division of their conference for a best-of-three series. The remaining games will be regular knockout matches, with the semifinals sending one team from each conference to the final. The official schedule and the venues of the playoffs was released on September 20, 2021, by Major League Cricket.

The inaugural season of Minor League Cricket had a total prize pool of $250,000, the highest ever in American cricket. This was increased to $350,000 for the 2022 season, $150,000 of which went to the tournament champions, the Seattle Thunderbolts.

Media 
Matches are streamed by Willow on its YouTube channel and the streaming platform Sling TV.

See also 
 Major League Cricket
 2021 Minor League Cricket season
 2021 Minor League Cricket season final
 Minor League Cricket teams
 History of United States cricket
 Cricket in the United States
 Impact of the COVID-19 pandemic on cricket

References

Minor League Cricket
Cricket leagues in the United States
2019 establishments in the United States
Sports leagues established in 2019